Kliima  is a village in Võru Parish, Võru County in southeastern Estonia.

Writer and former military officer Leo Kunnas (born 1967) was born in Kliima.

References

 

Villages in Võru County